Mississauga—Erindale was a federal electoral district in Ontario, Canada, that was represented in the House of Commons of Canada from 2004 to 2015.

It was created in 2003 from parts of Mississauga Centre and Mississauga West ridings. In 2013, it was abolished into Mississauga—Erin Mills, Mississauga Centre and Mississauga—Lakeshore.

It consisted of the part of the City of Mississauga bounded by a line drawn from the southwestern city limit northeast along Britannia Road West, southeast along Erin Mills Parkway, northeast along Eglinton Avenue West, southeast along Mavis Road, southwest along the Queensway West, west along the Credit River and southwest along Dundas Street West to the city limit.

Members of Parliament

This riding has elected the following Member of Parliament:

Election results

See also
 List of Canadian federal electoral districts
 Historical federal electoral districts of Canada

References

Riding history from the Library of Parliament
 2011 Results from Elections Canada
 Campaign expense data from Elections Canada

Notes

Former federal electoral districts of Ontario
Politics of Mississauga